Events from the year 1883 in Ireland.

Events
April – the narrow gauge Castlederg and Victoria Bridge Tramway opens in County Tyrone.
23 October – the Society of Jesus takes over University College Dublin.
30 October – two Clan na Gael dynamite bombs explode in the London Underground, injuring several people. Next day the British Home Secretary, William Vernon Harcourt, introduces the Explosives Bill.
1 November – Mater Infirmorum Hospital in Belfast admits its first patients.

Arts and literature
George Moore's first novel, the realist A Modern Lover, is published.

Sport

Rugby union
 Ireland take part in the inaugural Home Nations Championship
 Ireland's first home championship game played at Ormeau Road in Belfast.

Soccer
International
24 February  England 7–0 Ireland (in Liverpool)
17 March  Ireland 1–1 Wales (in Belfast)
  
Irish Cup
Winners: Cliftonville 5–0 Ulster

Births
7 January – Andrew Cunningham, 1st Viscount Cunningham of Hyndhope, British admiral of the Second World War and First Sea Lord (died 1963 in London).
14 January – Bulmer Hobson, nationalist, an early leader of the Irish Republican Brotherhood (died 1969).
15 January – Helena Molony, fights in the 1916 Easter Rising and first woman president of the Irish Trades Union Congress (died 1967).
24 January – Denis McCullough, Irish Volunteers, elected to the 4th Dáil Éireann (died 1968).
29 January – Billy McCracken, footballer and football manager (died 1979).
28 February – Seán Mac Diarmada, nationalist, rebel and Easter Rising leader (executed 1916).
1 May – Thomas J. Moore, actor (died 1955).
8 May – Máire Nic Shiubhlaigh, born Mary Walker, actress and Republican activist (died 1958).
13 May – Jimmy Archer, Major League baseball player (died 1958 in the United States).
23 June – Eva McGown, Official Hostess of Fairbanks and Honorary Hostess of Alaska (died 1972 in the United States).
15 July – Denny Barry, Irish Republican (died on hunger strike 1923).
2 August – Sam Irving, footballer and football manager (died 1968).
2 September – Alexander Haslett, independent TD (died 1951).
12 December – Peadar Kearney, Irish Republican and songwriter, co-author of "The Soldier's Song" (died 1942).
28 November – Rory O'Connor, Irish republican activist captured at the fall of the Four Courts (executed 1922).
28 December – St. John Greer Ervine, author and dramatist (died 1971 in London).
Full date unknown
Lorcán Ó Muireadais, priest and Irish language promoter (died 1941).
T. F. O'Rahilly, linguist and Irish language scholar (died 1953)
Louisa Watson Peat, writer and lecturer (died 1953 in the United States)

Deaths
9 February – Henry John Stephen Smith, mathematician (died 1826).
26 May – Edward Sabine, astronomer, scientist, ornithologist and explorer (born 1788).
25 July – Frederick Edward Maning, writer and judge in New Zealand (born 1812).
22 October – Thomas Mayne Reid, novelist (born 1818).
24 November – William Fitzgerald, Church of Ireland Bishop of Killaloe (born 1814).
17 December – James Carey, Fenian and informer, executed in London (born 1845).
Full date unknown
Robert Dwyer Joyce, music collector and writer (born 1830).

References

 
1880s in Ireland
Ireland
Years of the 19th century in Ireland
 Ireland